Fibroblast growth factor 18 is a protein that in humans is encoded by the FGF18 gene.

The protein encoded by this gene is a member of the fibroblast growth factor (FGF) family. FGF family members possess broad mitogenic and cell survival activities, and are involved in a variety of biological processes, including embryonic development, cell growth, morphogenesis, tissue repair, tumor growth, and invasion. It has been shown in vitro that this protein is able to induce neurite outgrowth in PC12 cells. FGF18 signals through fibroblast growth factor receptor FGFR3 to promote chondrogenesis and has been shown to cause thickening of cartilage in a murine model of osteoarthritis, and the recombinant version of it (sprifermin) is in clinical trial as a potential treatment for osteoarthritis. Studies of the similar proteins in mouse and chick suggested that this protein is a pleiotropic growth factor that stimulates proliferation in a number of tissues, most notably the liver and small intestine. Knockout studies of the similar gene in mice implied the role of this protein in regulating proliferation and differentiation of midline cerebellar structures.

References

Further reading

External links